Rajab Wazir Ali (born 19 November 1965) is a Kenyan former cricketer. He has played nine One Day International for Kenya. He is the first ODI cap for Kenya.

External links
 

1965 births
Living people
Kenyan cricketers
Kenya One Day International cricketers
Cricketers from Nairobi